I and I Shall Descend is the fourth studio album by Aurora Sutra, released on March 30, 1998 by Sound Factory.

Track listing

Personnel 
Adapted from I and I Shall Descend liner notes.

Aurora Sutra
 Carsten Klatte (as Lacasa Del Cid) – programming, production, vocals (1, 2, 7), double bass (1, 4, 8), tom tom (1, 4, 9), electric guitar (1, 5), bagpipes (2, 4), shakers (3, 5), acoustic guitar (4, 5), tambourine (5, 9), keyboards (5, 10), chanter (3), sitar (3), tabla (3), gong (3), EBow (5), djembe (5), tin whistle (8) Saz (9), Bongos (9), Cymbal (9), electric guitar (10), piano (10)
 Patricia Nigiani – lead vocals, production
 Friedrich Paravicini – violoncello (2, 8), double bass (2)

Production and design
 Axel Ermes – production, bells (10)
 Marcus Eschke – photography
 Ralf Fleischhauer – mastering
 Hauke Harms – production
 Ulrike Rank – design

Release history

References

External links 
 I and I Shall Descend at Discogs (list of releases)
 I and I Shall Descend at iTunes

1998 albums
Aurora Sutra albums